George of Duklja or Đorđe of Duklja may refer to:

 George I of Duklja, from the Vojislavljević dynasty, King of Duklja (1113-1118) and again (1125-1131)
 George II of Duklja, from the Nemanjić dynasty, titular King, and Prince of Duklja from 1208 to c. 1243

See also
 George I (disambiguation)
 George II (disambiguation)
 Michael of Duklja (disambiguation)
 Vladimir of Duklja (disambiguation)
 Duklja